The women's 78 kg competition of the judo events at the 2019 Pan American Games in Lima, Peru, was held on August 11 at the Polideportivo 3.

Results 
All times are local (UTC−5)

Bracket

Repechage round
Two bronze medals were awarded.

References

External links
(with results)

W78
2019
Pan American W78